Ika Yuliana Rochmawati (born 2 July 1989) is an Indonesian archer. She competed in the individual recurve event at the 2008, 2012 and 2016 Olympics with the best result of ninth place in 2012.

At the 2008 Summer Olympics in Beijing Rochmawati finished her ranking round with a total of 621 points. This gave her the 41st seed for the final competition bracket in which she faced Jennifer Nichols in the first round. The archer from the United States was too strong and eliminated Rochmawati with a 114–101 score.

At the 2012 Olympic Games, Rochmawati finished her ranking round as the 76th seed. She subsequently beat 3rd seed Yuting Fan (China) (6-4) in the 1/32 elimination round and 37th seed Amy Oliver (Great Britain) 7–1 in the 1/16 elimination round. She qualified for the Round of 16 on 1 August 2012, where she lost to Russia's Ksenia Perova. At the 2016 Olympics she was eliminated in the first round.

References

External links

 

1989 births
Living people
Olympic archers of Indonesia
Archers at the 2008 Summer Olympics
Archers at the 2012 Summer Olympics
Archers at the 2016 Summer Olympics
Indonesian female archers
Archers at the 2010 Asian Games
Archers at the 2014 Asian Games
Sportspeople from East Java
People from Bojonegoro Regency
Southeast Asian Games gold medalists for Indonesia
Southeast Asian Games bronze medalists for Indonesia
Southeast Asian Games medalists in archery
Competitors at the 2007 Southeast Asian Games
Competitors at the 2009 Southeast Asian Games
Competitors at the 2013 Southeast Asian Games
Competitors at the 2015 Southeast Asian Games
Asian Games competitors for Indonesia
Islamic Solidarity Games competitors for Indonesia
Islamic Solidarity Games medalists in archery
21st-century Indonesian women